Paul Scott Runyan (July 12, 1908 – March 17, 2002) was an American professional golfer. Among the world's best players in the mid-1930s, he won two PGA Championships, and is a member of the World Golf Hall of Fame. Runyan was also a golf instructor.

Early life
Born in Hot Springs, Arkansas, Runyan started out as a caddie and then an apprentice at a golf course in his hometown, before turning pro at age 17. He was head professional at a Little Rock club by age 18. Runyan served as head pro at Metropolis Country Club in White Plains, New York from 1931 to 1943 during which time he won both of his PGA championships.

Tour winner
Three years later, Runyan defeated Wood in extra holes in the title match of the 1934 PGA Championship, the first of his two PGA Championships. Of Runyan's 29 career PGA Tour wins, 16 of them came in 1933 and 1934, and his nine wins in 1933 make him one of only seven golfers to win nine or more times in one year on the PGA Tour. In the first Masters Tournament in 1934, he was paired for the first 36 holes with tournament host Bobby Jones. Runyan won the tour money title in 1934, and was a member of the U.S. Ryder Cup team in 1933 and 1935.

Runyan was competitive for many years; he won the PGA Championship again in 1938 and led the U.S. Open after three rounds as late as 1951. In the finals of his 1938 PGA, Runyan defeated Sam Snead 8 and 7, the most lopsided title match ever in the event, conducted as match play through 1957.

Fellow golfers nicknamed him "Little Poison" (a take on 1930s baseball player Lloyd Waner, who had the same nickname), primarily because he did not drive the ball very far, but also because he had a terrific short game. Runyan had worked tirelessly on his short game from boyhood, since he realized early on if he were to succeed in golf, he had to compensate for his lack of length. Runyan opined that he is the smallest player in golf history who had significant success, although Fred McLeod had a fine record, too, and stood only  and weighed a paltry .

Master teacher
Runyan's teaching prowess led many top pros to him over his 75 years of teaching, including Gene Littler, Phil Rodgers, Chuck Courtney, Frank Beard, Jim Ferree and Mickey Wright. Golf Magazine wrote: "... since the late 1930s, he has probably been the most influential short game instructor. Untold thousands have been taught his methods for putting and chipping." Runyan wrote an influential book outlining his short-game methods, The Short Way to Lower Scoring.

He appears as a contestant on the 25th October 1950 edition of You Bet Your Life where he tells an anecdote of hitting a spectator with his ball and in another competition his partner hits the same man.

In 2000, he completed the annual Par 3 competition held one day before the Masters at the age of 91. He died in Palm Springs, California.

Honors
Runyan was inducted into the World Golf Hall of Fame in 1990. In addition, he is a member of the World Golf Teachers Hall of Fame, the Arkansas Hall of Fame and The Southern California Golf Association Hall of Fame. He received the Harvey Penick Lifetime Teaching Award and the PGA of America Distinguished Service Award.

Professional wins

PGA Tour wins (29)
1930 (2) North and South Open, New Jersey Open
1931 (2) Metropolitan PGA, Westchester Open
1932 (1) Gasparilla Open Match Play
1933 (9) Agua Caliente Open, Miami Biltmore Open (March), Virginia Beach Cavalier Open, Eastern Open Championship, National Capital Open, Mid-South Pro-Pro (with Willie Macfarlane), Mid-South Open (tie with Willie Macfarlane and Joe Turnesa), Miami International Four-Ball (with Horton Smith), Pasadena Open
1934 (6) St. Petersburg Open, Florida West Coast Open, Tournament of the Gardens Open, The Cavalier Open, Metropolitan Open, PGA Championship
1935 (4) North and South Open, Grand Slam Open, Westchester Open, Metropolitan PGA
1936 (2) Westchester Open, Metropolitan PGA
1938 (1) PGA Championship
1939 (1) Westchester Open
1941 (1) Goodall Round Robin

Major championships are shown in bold.

Other wins
this list is probably incomplete
1934 Westchester Open
1938 Argentine Open
1942 Westchester Open
1947 Southern California PGA Championship

Senior wins
1961 PGA Seniors' Championship, World Senior Championship
1962 PGA Seniors' Championship, World Senior Championship

Major championships

Wins (2)

Note: The PGA Championship was match play through 1957

Results timeline

NYF = tournament not yet founded 
NT = no tournament 
WD = withdrew 
DQ = disqualified 
DNQ = did not qualify for match play portion 
CUT = missed the half-way cut 
R64, R32, R16, QF, SF = Round in which player lost in PGA Championship match play 
"T" indicates a tie for a place

Summary

Most consecutive cuts made – 33 (1933 PGA – 1952 U.S. Open)
Longest streak of top-10s – 6 (1934 PGA – 1936 U.S. Open)

See also
List of golfers with most PGA Tour wins
Most PGA Tour wins in a year

References

External links

American male golfers
PGA Tour golfers
Ryder Cup competitors for the United States
Winners of men's major golf championships
World Golf Hall of Fame inductees
American golf instructors
Golf writers and broadcasters
Golfers from Arkansas
Golfers from New York (state)
Sportspeople from Hot Springs, Arkansas
1908 births
2002 deaths